Millbank is a mixed-use suburb in the Bundaberg Region, Queensland, Australia. In the  Millbank had a population of 2,512 people.

Geography
The suburb is bounded to the north by the Burnett River.

The Bundaberg General Cemetery occupies the southern corner of the suburb extending west into Avoca. The northern part of the suburb is used for agriculture, a mix of growing sugarcane and grazing on native vegetation. The rest of the suburb is used for residential purposes.

History
In 1869 a cemetery was established a block bounded by Woongarra, Maryborough, Woondooma and McLean Streets (in present-day Bundaberg Central). In 1881 the deteriorating condition of the old cemetery led to calls to exhume and relocate the burials from the old cemetery to the new, with the rationale that the proceeds of selling the land of the old cemetery would outweigh the cost of relocating the graves. The relocation of the graves was completed by January 1882.

In the 2011 census, Millbank had a population of 2,601 people.

In the  Millbank had a population of 2,512 people.

Heritage listings 
Millbank has a number of heritage-listed sites, including:
 46 Johnston Street: South Sea Islander Church

Education
There are no schools in Millbank. The nearest government primary schools are Avoca State School in neighbouring Avoca to the west and Bundaberg West State School in neighbouring Bundaberg West to the east. The nearest government secondary school is Bundaberg State High School in Bundaberg South to the east.

Facilities
Bundaberg General and Lawn Cemetery is a block bounded by Takalvan Street, Hampson Street, Johnson Street and Bolewski Streets.

Millbank Wastewater Treatment Plant is a sewage treatment plant at Duffy Street. It discharges the treated water into the adjacent Burnett River.

Bundaberg International Motor Inn is at 73 Takalvan Street.

Amenities
Millbank has quite a range of small restaurants and businesses, as well as some larger franchises. Smaller businesses are generally located in the centre of the suburb and include a fish and chip shop and Thai restaurant. Larger services are located along Takalvan Street and include a Caltex Petrol station, Supercheap Auto, Country Comfort Motel and a Hungry Jack's Restaurant.

There are a number of parks in the locality, including:

 Alexandra Park
 Avoca Street Park

 Jubilee Park

 Letinic Street Park

References

External links

 

Suburbs of Bundaberg
Bundaberg Region